Jeong Doo-hee (also Jeong Du-hui, ; born December 4, 1984) is a South Korean former swimmer, who specialized in butterfly events. He represented his nation South Korea at the 2004 Summer Olympics, and shared silver medals with Park Seon-kwan, Choi Kyu-woong, and Park Tae-hwan in the 4×100 m medley relay at the 2010 Asian Games in Guangzhou, China.

Jeong qualified for two swimming events at the 2004 Summer Olympics in Athens, by clearing FINA B-standard entry times of 54.91 (100 m butterfly) and 2:00.84 (200 m butterfly) from the Dong-A Swimming Tournament in Seoul. In the 200 m butterfly, Jeong challenged seven other swimmers on the second heat, including Olympic veteran Vladan Marković of Serbia and Montenegro. He raced to second place in his heat and twenty-fourth overall by 0.84 of a second behind Canada's Nathaniel O'Brien in 2:00.96. In the 100 m butterfly, Jeong blasted a new South Korean record of 54.79 to break a 55-second barrier and top the third heat. Jeong failed to advance into the semifinals, as he placed thirty-eighth overall out of 59 swimmers in the preliminaries.

References

1984 births
Living people
South Korean male butterfly swimmers
Olympic swimmers of South Korea
Swimmers at the 2004 Summer Olympics
Swimmers at the 2006 Asian Games
Swimmers at the 2010 Asian Games
Asian Games medalists in swimming
Asian Games silver medalists for South Korea
Asian Games bronze medalists for South Korea
Medalists at the 2006 Asian Games
Medalists at the 2010 Asian Games
21st-century South Korean people